The Original Sin is a 1948 German comedy film directed by Helmut Käutner. It was entered into the 1949 Cannes Film Festival.

Cast
 Bettina Moissi as Eva Meier-Eden (Eva)
 Bobby Todd as Adam Schmidt (Adam)
 Joana Maria Gorvin as Lilly Schmith (Lilith)
 Arno Assmann as Dr. Lutz (Lucifer)
 Helmut Käutner as Prof. Petri (Petrus)
 Irene von Meyendorff
 Margarete Haagen
 Thea Thiele
 Gerda Corbett
 Willy Maertens
 Nicolas Koline
 Carl Voscherau
 Bum Krüger
 Rudolf Vogel

References

External links

1948 films
1948 comedy films
German comedy films
German satirical films
West German films
1940s German-language films
German black-and-white films
Films directed by Helmut Käutner
Cultural depictions of Adam and Eve
1940s German films